This is a list of notable works available under a Creative Commons license. Works available under a Creative Commons license are becoming more common. Note that there are multiple Creative Commons licenses with important differences.

Number of Creative Commons works
An analysis in November 2014 revealed that the amount of CC-licensed works in major databases and searchable via Google sums up to 882 million works. Nine million webpages linking to one of the CC licenses.

Creative Commons offers also a search engine for major databases as: Europeana, Open Clip Art Library, Pixabay, ccMixter and more.

Governments and intergovernmental organizations
, 31 governments and 7 intergovernmental organizations have made their information available per CC according to creativecommons.org, similarly dozens of organizations from the GLAM sector (Galleries, Libraries, Archives, and Museums).

Books
Creative Commons maintains a book list themselves.

Comics

Educational resources

Games

Video games

Images and photos

Music

News

Knowledge, research and science

Databases and data

Technology, blueprints and recipes

Video and film
The Creative Commons maintain a film list themselves.

Websites

References